Benjamin Coleman (November 14, 1961 – January 6, 2019) was an American professional basketball player. In college, he played for the University of Minnesota and the University of Maryland. Professionally, he played five seasons in the National Basketball Association (NBA) as well as in Italy and Spain.

Early life 
Coleman was born on November 14, 1961, in Minneapolis. He played basketball at North Community High School. After graduation, he received a scholarship to play at the University of Minnesota. In 1979, he became the first player from Minneapolis North to receive a scholarship from a Division I college. He was also the first African-American player from a Minneapolis City Conference school to play for Minnesota.

He spent much of his time at Minnesota coming off the bench. In his redshirt freshman year of 1980–1981, he averaged 8.4 points and 5.1 rebounds per game. After that season, he decided to transfer to the University of Maryland. Coleman commented that he was able to make a statement for his community by playing for his hometown Gophers, but also faced a lot of pressure playing there. Under transfer rules, he sat out the 1981–1982 season.

At Maryland, Coleman teamed up with Len Bias, who went on to be the second overall pick in the 1986 NBA draft. He won two All-ACC honors and helped the team to the 1984 Atlantic Coast Conference championship and to a Sweet Sixteen appearance in the 1984 NCAA tournament.

After graduation, he was selected by the Chicago Bulls in the second round (37th overall) in the 1984 NBA draft. He did not make the Bulls roster and decided to sign with Stefanel Trieste in Italy's Serie A. The Bulls traded his rights to the Portland Trail Blazers for Mike Smrek, but he again failed to make the team and returned to Italy. After two years in Italy, he returned to the United States and signed with the New Jersey Nets.

In the middle of his second season with the Nets, New Jersey traded him and Mike Gminski to the Philadelphia 76ers for Roy Hinson and Tim McCormick. He played the remainder of the 1988–89 season in Philadelphia. Before the 1989–90 NBA season, he signed with the Milwaukee Bucks but his season was cut short due to injury in February and he was waived.

The following season he began a three-year stint in Spain, signing with Baloncesto León in Spain. He moved to FC Barcelona and CB Peñas Huesca.

For the 1983–84 NBA season, Coleman returned to the U.S. with the Rapid City Thrillers of the Continental Basketball Association. He signed a ten-day contract with the Detroit Pistons. After Detroit did not retain him, he played on a rest-of-season contract with Roma and the following season with Montecatiniterme Basketball in Italy.

He ended his playing career with the Sioux Falls Skyforce and Omaha Racers of the CBA.

After he retired, Coleman coached in the greater Minneapolis area with the private coaching service, CoachUp.

Coleman died on January 6, 2019, at age 57.

NBA career statistics

Regular season

|-
| align="left" | 1986–87
| align="left" | New Jersey
| 68 || 7 || 15.1 || .581 || .000 || .727 || 4.2 || 0.5 || 0.5 || 0.5 || 6.6
|-
| align="left" | 1987–88
| align="left" | New Jersey
| 27 || 10 || 24.3 || .483 || .000 || .774 || 6.4 || 1.4 || 1.0 || 0.6 || 11.0
|-
| align="left" | 1987–88
| align="left" | Philadelphia
| 43 || 14 || 19.6 || .516 || .000 || .752 || 4.1 || 0.5 || 0.3 || 0.6 || 6.9
|-
| align="left" | 1988–89
| align="left" | Philadelphia
| 58 || 11 || 12.1 || .485 || .000 || .792 || 3.1 || 0.3 || 0.2 || 0.3 || 5.1
|-
| align="left" | 1989–90
| align="left" | Milwaukee
| 22 || 0 || 13.9 || .474 || .000 || .829 || 4.0 || 0.5 || 0.3 || 0.3 || 5.7
|-
| align="left" | 1993–94
| align="left" | Detroit
| 9 || 0 || 8.6 || .480 || .000 || .500 || 2.9 || 0.0 || 0.2 || 0.2 || 3.1
|- class="sortbottom"
| style="text-align:center;" colspan="2"| Career
| 227 || 42 || 15.9 || .516 || .000 || .759 || 4.1 || 0.6 || 0.4 || 0.4 || 6.6
|}

Playoffs

|-
| align="left" | 1988–89
| align="left" | Philadelphia
| 3 || 0 || 7.7 || .750 || .000 || 1.000 || 1.7 || 0.0 || 0.3 || 0.0 || 4.7
|}

References

External links
College & NBA statistics @ basketballreference.com
Italian League profile

1961 births
2019 deaths
African-American basketball players
American expatriate basketball people in Italy
American expatriate basketball people in Spain
American men's basketball players
Baloncesto León players
Basketball players from Minneapolis
CB Peñas Huesca players
Centers (basketball)
Chicago Bulls draft picks
Detroit Pistons players
FC Barcelona Bàsquet players
Liga ACB players
Maryland Terrapins men's basketball players
Milwaukee Bucks players
Minnesota Golden Gophers men's basketball players
Montecatiniterme Basketball players
New Jersey Nets players
Omaha Racers players
Pallacanestro Trieste players
Pallacanestro Virtus Roma players
Philadelphia 76ers players
Power forwards (basketball)
Rapid City Thrillers players
Sioux Falls Skyforce (CBA) players
North Community High School alumni
20th-century African-American sportspeople
21st-century African-American people